Emanuele Berrettoni (born 17 May 1981) is a former Italian football player.

Club career
He played 4 seasons (31 games, no goals) in the Serie A for S.S. Lazio and Perugia Calcio.

He played one game in the 2000–01 UEFA Champions League for S.S. Lazio (on 7 November 2000 against Sparta Prague) and scored a goal in the 2002 UEFA Intertoto Cup for Perugia Calcio against VfB Stuttgart.

In June 2009 he was signed by Verona.

From 2012 to 2014 plays in the Bassano Virtus; then he moved to Ascoli with which he was promoted to Serie B. In January 2016 back in the Lega Pro signing for Pordenone.

He retired at the end of the 2018–19 season.

Honours
Perugia
UEFA Intertoto Cup: 2003

References

External links
 

1981 births
Living people
Italian footballers
Italy youth international footballers
Serie A players
Serie B players
Serie C players
S.S. Lazio players
A.C. Perugia Calcio players
Catania S.S.D. players
F.C. Crotone players
S.S.C. Napoli players
S.P.A.L. players
F.C. Grosseto S.S.D. players
Hellas Verona F.C. players
Bassano Virtus 55 S.T. players
Ascoli Calcio 1898 F.C. players
Pordenone Calcio players
Association football forwards